Romano Obilinović (born 27 September 1979) is a Croatian retired footballer who played as a forward.

Career
Although Obilinović had his Croatian top level debut late in his career in the 2010–11 season for RNK Split, he previously had successful spells with several clubs in the Slovenian PrvaLiga (becoming the league's top scorer in the 2001–02 season) and the Croatian Second Division, where he had stints with several clubs in Dalmatia including Solin, Zadar, Mosor and Imotski. He was the league's top scorer with Imotski in the 2009–10 season.

He also won 2016 edition of Big Brother in Croatia.

References

External links
 
Romano Obilinović profile at Nogometni magazin 

1979 births
Living people
Footballers from Split, Croatia
Association football forwards
Croatian footballers
NK Tabor Sežana players
NK Primorje players
FC Koper players
NK Mura players
NK Solin players
NK Zadar players
NK Mosor players
NK Imotski players
RNK Split players
Slovenian PrvaLiga players
First Football League (Croatia) players
Croatian Football League players
Croatian expatriate footballers
Expatriate footballers in Slovenia
Croatian expatriate sportspeople in Slovenia
Big Brother (franchise) winners